Mark Nelson Paston (born 13 December 1976) is a New Zealand former football goalkeeper who most recently played for the Wellington Phoenix in the A-League before announcing his retirement from professional football at the end of the 2012/13 A-League season.

Club career

Early career
Paston's senior career began with Napier City Rovers before he moved to the United Kingdom in 2003 to join Bradford City. He followed this with a season at Walsall and then St Johnstone, before returning to New Zealand with the New Zealand Knights.

Wellington Phoenix
Paston signed for A-League club Wellington Phoenix in 2007 from the New Zealand Knights. Paston made his debut for the Phoenix against Adelaide United where they lost 4–1. Paston was often the Phoenix second choice goalkeeper but when Glen Moss left to Melbourne Victory, Paston became Phoenix's first-choice goalkeeper.

Paston signed a new one-year contract at the beginning of the 2009, keeping him at the Phoenix until the end of the 2009/2010 season. Paston played a large part in the Phoenix's undefeated home streak A-League record by keeping clean sheets against Central Coast Mariners and Gold Coast United.
On 10 December 2009 Paston suffered a tibia fracture that kept him sidelined for the rest of the season.

On 19 January 2010, Paston along with teammates Reece Crowther and Troy Hearfield signed contract extensions with the Phoenix. Paston is contracted until the conclusion of the 2011–12 season.

In a repeat of history, Paston suffered another tibial fracture below the right knee on 11 December 2010 after a collision in the loss to Gold Coast United, sidelining him for the second half of the 2010–2011 season.

On 31 March 2013 Mark Paston announced his retirement from Wellington Phoenix and all professional football following the final 2012/13 regular season game in Round 27 against Melbourne Victory at Westpac Stadium.

International career
Paston, having represented New Zealand at Under-23 level, made his full All Whites debut at the age of 20 in a 5–0 loss to Indonesia on 21 September 1997, but did not feature in another full international until 2003, Jason Batty, Michael Utting and later Ross Nicholson being preferred choices. Since returning to the international side in 2003, Paston has competed with former Wellington Phoenix teammate Glen Moss for the goalkeeper position. Since 2003 New Zealand has played 59 matches and between Paston (35) and Moss (21) they have played 56 matches between them.

He was named in the New Zealand 2009 Confederations Cup squad to travel to South Africa, where he was second choice as Moss played in all three games. However, Moss' suspension from international football for improper conduct meant that Paston played in the World Cup Qualification playoff against Bahrain. On 10 October 2009 Paston kept a clean sheet in the first leg in Riffa, and in the return leg on 14 November 2009 he was Man of the Match, saving a penalty from Sayed Mohamed Adnan in the 51st minute which was enough to secure New Zealand a 1–0 win in Wellington, enabling them to qualify for the World Cup for only the second time in their history.

Paston's fractured leg had threatened to harm his World Cup chances, but the goalkeeper made a good recovery and was named in New Zealand's final 23-man squad to compete at the World Cup on 10 May 2010. With Moss' suspension running into the first two games of the World Cup, Paston went on to play all of New Zealand's matches as Ricki Herbert's first-choice goalkeeper.

On 15 June 2010, Paston started against Slovakia and played an important role in helping New Zealand secure their first ever World Cup point with a 1–1 draw, however in the first half he went to clear the ball but completely missed it in his attempted kick, luckily Slovakia could not convert the chance. Five days later he was instrumental in ensuring the All Whites drew 1–1 with reigning champions Italy, making several acrobatic saves. His good form meant that he started the final group game against Paraguay on 24 June, but despite pulling off more excellent saves and keeping a clean sheet in a 0–0 draw, the All Whites were unable to reach the last 16.

Following the retirement from Wellington Phoenix at the end of the 2012/13 A-League season, Paston did not make his retirement from international football official until 8 August 2013.

International clean sheets and caps
New Zealand's goal tally first.

International career statistics

Career statistics

See also
 New Zealand national football team
 New Zealand at the FIFA World Cup
 New Zealand national football team results
 List of New Zealand international footballers

References

External links
 Mark Paston Interview
 
 
 Profile NZ Soccer – All White
 

1976 births
Living people
New Zealand association footballers
New Zealand international footballers
Bradford City A.F.C. players
St Johnstone F.C. players
A-League Men players
New Zealand Knights FC players
Wellington Phoenix FC players
Walsall F.C. players
Sportspeople from Hastings, New Zealand
Association football goalkeepers
Napier City Rovers FC players
Expatriate footballers in England
New Zealand expatriate sportspeople in England
2003 FIFA Confederations Cup players
2004 OFC Nations Cup players
2008 OFC Nations Cup players
2009 FIFA Confederations Cup players
2010 FIFA World Cup players